Solapur - Hubballi Intercity Express is an intercity train of the Indian Railways connecting Solapur in Maharashtra and Hubballi of Karnataka. It is currently being operated with 11423/11424 train numbers on a daily basis.

Service

The 11423/Solapur - Hubballi Intercity Express has an average speed of 44 km/hr and covers 359 km in 8 hrs 5 mins. 11424/Hubballi - Solapur Intercity Express has an average speed of 43 km/hr and 359 km in 8 hrs 15 mins.

Schedule
Train runs Daily form both the station. Only rake dedicated to this route

Route and halts 

The important halts of the train are:

Coach composite

The train has standard ICF rakes with max speed of 110 kmph. The train consists of 22 coaches :

 1 Chair car
 6 General
 2 Second-class Luggage/parcel van

Traction

Both trains are hauled by a Pune Loco Shed based WDM-3A electric locomotive from Solapur to Hubali and vice versa.

Direction reversal

Train reverses its direction 1 times:

Notes

References

External links 
 11423/Solapur - Hubballi Intercity Express
 11424/Hubballi - Solapur Intercity Express

Intercity Express (Indian Railways) trains
Rail transport in Maharashtra
Rail transport in Karnataka
Transport in Hubli-Dharwad
Transport in Solapur